Hollywood Rehearsal is a collection of demos by L.A. Guns that was released in Japan. None of the demos had already been released.

Track listing
 "I Feel Nice" (The Psyclone Rangers Cover)
 "High on You" (Iggy Pop Cover)
 "Strange Boat" (The Waterboys Cover)
 "Gunslinger" (Bogey Boys Cover)
 "Rip Off" (T. Rex (band) Cover)
 "Should I Stay or Should I Go" (The Clash cover)
 "Custard Pie" (Led Zeppelin cover)
 "Rock Candy" (Montrose cover)
 "All the Way"
 "Guilty"
 "Long Time Dead" (remix)
 "Dangerous Games"

Personnel
Phil Lewis: vocals
Tracii Guns: guitar
Mick Cripps: guitar and keyboards
Kelly Nickels: bass
Steve Riley: drums

References

L.A. Guns EPs
L.A. Guns compilation albums
1998 compilation albums